Olin Levi Warner (April 9, 1844August 14, 1896) was an American sculptor and artist noted for the striking bas relief portrait medallions and busts he created in the late 19th century.

Early life
Warner was born in Suffield, Connecticut. Warner's great-great-uncle was the Revolutionary leader Seth Warner.

Career
As a young man he worked as an artisan and a telegraph operator. In 1869, he had saved up enough money to move to Paris, where he studied sculpture at the École nationale supérieure des Beaux-Arts under François Jouffroy, and worked as an assistant to Jean-Baptiste Carpeaux.

When the French Third Republic was proclaimed in 1870, he enlisted in the Foreign Legion, resuming his studies when the siege was over (May 1871). 

In 1872, he moved to New York City and established a studio. He was one of the founders and a member of the Society of American Artists in 1877, and an associate of the National Academy of Design in 1888.

A trip through the Northwest Territory led to a series of Native American-themed portrait medallions. He designed the souvenir half-dollar for the Columbian Exposition, held in Chicago in 1893.

After meeting with little commercial success, however, he returned to live at his father's farm in Vermont, where he also did work for manufacturers of silver and plated ware.  Towards the end of his life his sculptures became known to a wider audience.

Death
He died in 1896, after a cycling accident in Central Park in New York City. In the 1970s, Warner's heirs donated his collection of personal papers to the Smithsonian Institution's Archives of American Art.

Warner is credited with popularizing the bas relief, through numerous portraits in this style.  Among his best known works are:

 May (1872)
 "Edwin Forrest" (medallion, 1876)
 Rutherford B. Hayes (bust, 1876)
 Twilight (1878)
 Dancing Nymph (1879)
 Eight portrait busts on the facade of the Brooklyn Historical Society including Michelangelo, Beethoven, Columbus, Franklin, Gutenberg, Shakespeare, a Norseman, and a Native American. (1881)
 "Gov. William Alfred Buckingham" (statue, 1883)
 Statue of William Lloyd Garrison (1885)
 "The Reverend William F. Morgan, D. D." (bust, 1887)
 Skidmore Fountain for Portland, Oregon (1888)
 Diana (1888)
 Major General Charles Devens (statue, 1892–1896)
 In 1895, he was commissioned to create three bronze portals (tympanum and pair of doors) for the Library of Congress. The three tympanums and one door had been completed when he died. Herbert Adams completed the commission.

References 

Attribution

External links

1844 births
1896 deaths
19th-century American male artists
American alumni of the École des Beaux-Arts
American architectural sculptors
American male sculptors
Cycling road incident deaths
People from Suffield, Connecticut
Road incident deaths in New York City
Soldiers of the French Foreign Legion